Stigmella aliena is a moth of the family Nepticulidae. It is found in New Zealand. The length of the forewings is about 3 mm.

References

Nepticulidae
Moths of New Zealand
Endemic fauna of New Zealand
Moths described in 1989
Endemic moths of New Zealand